Jado Wahan 
() is the Union Council of Taluka Gambat District, Khairpur Mirs, Sindh, Pakistan. It is an agricultural zone.

It is linked with talka headquarter city Gambat  with Gambat-Agra road and it is also connected with Larkana-Khairpur bypass with a same Gambat-Agra road.

Around area of forms is irrigated with Hameerji canal.

There are large orchard of date palms, mangoes, lemon, olive and some of cherries orchards.

In domestic animals peoples keep buffalos, cows, goats, sheep, poultry and dogs.

There is a petrol pump station named Asad petroleum services.

There is a government public health care center.

References

Populated places in Khairpur District